H. Hyune-Ju Kim is a Korean-American statistician known for her research on change point detection, segmented regression, and applications to the analysis of mortality and incidence of cancer. She is a professor in the department of mathematics at Syracuse University.

Kim earned a bachelor's degree in mathematics from Seoul National University in 1983, and completed a Ph.D. in statistics at Stanford University in 1988. Her dissertation, Change-Point Problems in Regression, was supervised by David Siegmund. She joined Syracuse University as an assistant professor in 1989, and became full professor there in 2009.

References

External links
Home page

Year of birth missing (living people)
Living people
20th-century South Korean mathematicians
American statisticians
American women statisticians
Seoul National University alumni
Stanford University alumni
Syracuse University faculty